The European Society for Analytic Philosophy (ESAP)  is a philosophical organization founded by Kevin Mulligan, Barry Smith, Peter Simons, Pierre Jacob, Diego Marconi, Francois Recanati, Marco Santambrogio, Andreas Kemmerling and Pascal Engel in 1991.

History
The founders of ESAP felt that after the long interruption due to World War II and the North American exile of many European philosophers, analytic philosophy was finally flourishing again in Europe. But even though more and more people were doing analytic philosophy in Continental Europe, they were often not even aware of each other's existence. Both in their writings and in their personal interactions, European analytic philosophers were looking rather exclusively towards North America and Britain. But now, it seemed the time was ripe for bringing together analytic philosophers from all over Europe in one society furthering inter-European contacts, connections, and collaboration. Thus, ESAP was born. Today, analytic philosophy on the whole is flourishing more than ever in Europe. European analytic philosophers are also far more connected to one another and have far more of a voice to be reckoned with in the international publishing landscape. Especially in times of growing economic and political pressures on higher education and research, ESAP sees its mission in furthering and facilitating these connections, collaborations, and the conditions for research in analytic philosophy across Europe.

ESAP's first president was François Recanati. He organized the first European Congress for Analytic Philosophy (ECAP) in 1993 in Aix-en-Provence. The ECAP has become the big get-together for analytic philosophers at any level of their careers in Europe. Organizing it every third year is one of the main tasks of the ESAP presidents. ESAP can by now look back on a long list of illustrious presidents who have devoted much time and labor to organizing a long list of vibrant events in many of the great cities of Europe: Peter Simons organized ECAP2 in Leeds (1996), Nenad Miscevic ECAP3 in Maribor (1999), Wlodek Rabinowicz ECAP4 in Lund (2002), João Branquino ECAP5 in Lisbon (2005), Jan Wolenski ECAP6 in Cracow (2008), Michele di Francesco ECAP7 in Milan (2011), Mircea Dumitru ECAP8 in Bucharest (2013). In 2017, ECAP9 will be held at LMU Munich, organized by ESAP's current president, Stephan Hartmann. During the presidency of Peter Simons, the journal Dialectica became the official journal of ESAP. As early as in 1997, the first website of ESAP was set up by Božidar Kante. It was renewed by Carlo Penco in 1999 and maintained by him till 2015.

External links 
 ESAP Facebook

Analytic philosophy
Philosophical societies
Pan-European learned societies
1991 establishments in Europe